Ranunculus peltatus, the pond water-crowfoot, is a plant species in the genus Ranunculus, native to Europe, southwestern Asia and northern Africa.

It is a herbaceous annual or perennial plant generally found in slow streams, ponds, or lakes. It has two different leaf types, broad rounded floating leaves 3–5 cm in diameter with three to seven shallow lobes, and finely divided thread-like submerged leaves. The flowers are white with a yellow centre, 15–20 mm in diameter, with five petals.

There are two sub-species; R. p. peltatus, which favours clean water, and R. p. baudoti (Brackish Water-crowfoot) which is found in brackish coastal habitats. The latter form requires a minimum level of salt to survive.

References

External links
 

peltatus
Flora of Africa
Flora of Asia
Flora of Europe
Plants described in 1789
Taxa named by Franz von Paula Schrank